The Good Fight is a studio album by American hip hop artist Oddisee. It was released via Mello Music Group on May 5, 2015. Music videos were created for "Counter-Clockwise" and "Belong to the World".

Critical reception

At Metacritic, which assigns a weighted average score out of 100 to reviews from mainstream critics, the album received an average score of 80, based on 8 reviews, indicating "generally favorable reviews".

Marcus J. Moore of Pitchfork gave the album a 7.3 out of 10 and stated that "The Good Fight exudes a sense of artistic freedom not heard on Oddisee's previous releases." David Jeffries of AllMusic gave the album 4 stars out of 5, calling it "inspired, infectious, and artistically grand."

In 2015, HipHopDX included it on the "30 Best Underground Hip Hop Albums Since 2000" list.

Track listing

Personnel
Credits adapted from liner notes.

 Oddisee – vocals, production, arrangement, mixing
 Maimouna Youssef – vocals (3, 11)
 Nick Hakim – vocals (8), backing vocals
 Gary Clark, Jr. – vocals (11), guitar
 Tranqill – vocals (12)
 K.A. Hezekiah – backing vocals
 Davis Fasaluku – backing vocals
 Tamba Fasaluku – backing vocals
 Ralph Washington – keyboards
 Dennis Turner – bass guitar
 Anthony Coleman – horns
 Jason Disu – horns
 Amir Mohamed – executive production
 Michael Tolle – executive production
 Brian Gardner – mastering
 Q+A – graphic design, photography
 Liz Barclay – photography
 Adrian Carter – styling

Charts

References

External links
 
 

2015 albums
Oddisee albums
Mello Music Group albums